Xavier ("Xavi") Arnau Creus (born 20 March 1973 in Terrassa, Catalonia) is a former field hockey player from Spain. He won the silver medal with the men's national team at the 1996 Summer Olympics in Atlanta, Georgia. The striker also participated in the 1992 Summer Olympics and the 2000 Summer Olympics.

References
Spanish Olympic Committee

External links
 

1973 births
Spanish male field hockey players
Field hockey players from Catalonia
Male field hockey forwards
Sportspeople from Terrassa
Olympic field hockey players of Spain
Field hockey players at the 1992 Summer Olympics
Field hockey players at the 1996 Summer Olympics
Field hockey players at the 2000 Summer Olympics
1998 Men's Hockey World Cup players
2002 Men's Hockey World Cup players
Living people
Olympic silver medalists for Spain
Olympic medalists in field hockey
Medalists at the 1996 Summer Olympics
Atlètic Terrassa players
20th-century Spanish people